The Development Assistance Database (DAD) is an Aid Information Management System (AIMS) developed by Synergy International Systems, for tracking development aid and managing official development assistance with transparency and accountability. DAD is widely adopted AIMS which has been established in more than 35 countries worldwide in close cooperation with UNDP and respective governments.

DAD provides country governments and development partners with a consolidated source of data on development projects across all donors, demonstrates "who is doing what, when and where" in managing foreign aid, enables harmonization of development projects with national priorities, facilitates management and coordination of development efforts in the country by and promotes results-driven decision-making and aid effectiveness.

DAD serves /has served as the official government AIMS in Afghanistan, Armenia, Burundi, Cameroon, Central African Republic, Comoros, Georgia, Ghana, Guatemala, India, Indonesia, Iraq (including Kurdistan Regional Government), Kazakhstan, Kenya, Maldives, Mauritania, Nigeria, Lesotho, Pakistan, Papua New Guinea, Philippines, Russia, Rwanda, Sierra Leone, Sri Lanka, Somalia (including Somaliland), Solomon Islands, Tajikistan, Thailand, Ukraine, Vietnam, Yemen and Zambia.

History

Originally known as the Donor Assistance Database, the DAD was re-branded as the Development Assistance Database on August 2, 2005. The first Donor Assistance Database was a PC system developed in the scope of the G7 Support Implementation Group project for Russia in 1996 to monitor aid assistance donated from the international community. The first Donor Assistance Database tracked 20,000 projects and over US$100 billion in Official Development Assistance delivered between 1991 and 2001. The DAD was then adapted as a tool for the Newly Independent States of the former Soviet Union to monitor development assistance from the international community. These first generation implementations include Armenia, Georgia, Kazakhstan, Kyrgyzstan, Turkmenistan, Ukraine, and Tajikistan.

Most of these implementations have taken place through a partnership between the software company Synergy International Systems, and the United Nations Development Programme (UNDP). This partnership led to the signing of a Long Term Agreement in July, 2005.

Functions and Capabilities 
Online, offline and mobile collection of aid information – DAD's customized data entry forms with validation control enable to submit and update aid information though web-based interface, in offline mode which is specifically for use in areas with limited or no Internet access as well as through smartphones and tablets.

Sector Profile – This functionality displays aggregate data related to particular sectors, including aid flows and projects in a given sector, donors involved, and results achieved. The Sector Profile can have all relevant information on sector portfolio performance, logistics etc.

Monitoring and Evaluation (M&E) – DAD enables to link aid projects with the government's policy priorities and national development strategies, and monitor progress in respect to targets/goals to track progress toward development results.

Data visualization and analytics – DAD offers a suite of web-based querying, analytics, visualization, and reporting tools - graphs, charts, tables, reports– for visualizing and interpreting aid information.

Executive dashboard – This decision-support tool displays data snapshots of aid flows (pledges, commitments, disbursements, and expenditures) and enables simultaneous viewing of all analytical outputs.

Geographic Information System - DAD platform contains a Geographic Information System (GIS) mapping feature that allows to view geo-referenced data on project activities and results at various geographic levels and also to query or filter data on the web-based dynamic maps.

Aid Effectiveness Portal – DAD provides a range of knowledge sharing and collaboration tools to make aid information available to the public.

Integration – DAD can interface with relevant external and internal data sources in order to automate data exchange to enable effective flow of information and prevent duplication of effort and silos of information.

Multi-lingual capability – DAD can be adapted to the specific needs of a given country, including the localization of the software into the national language.

DAD Featured Projects

Rwanda
DAD Rwanda is Rwanda's official development aid (ODA) coordination system. It is used by the Ministry of Finance and Economy (MINECOFIN) to track and manage aid funds and development results across all major donors and NGOs. The system captures the national Donor Performance Assessment Framework (DPAF) mutual accountability framework, indicators and standard definitions and is used for annual Rwanda ODA Effectiveness reports. In 2010 an upgrade of the DAD resulted in establishing a new MTEF module with the view of systematically capturing forward-spending plans of Development Partners to feed into the MTEF process. DAD Rwanda was also integrated with Rwanda's SmartFMIS budgeting platform that resulted in more external funds flowing directly to Ministry of Planning for spending. Transparent governance has improved Rwanda's Business Environment rankings and Rwanda's data-driven model for aid management has been emulated by Burundi, Cameroon, Mauritania and Central African Republic.

Iraq 
Launched in 2011 Iraq Development Management System (IDMS) is a web-based planning, budgeting and results tracking system used by the Iraq Ministry of Planning (MoP) to manage the entire cycle of government and donor-funded projects.  IDMS covers 3000 projects with a total value of US$186 billion under the National Development Plan (NDP) 2010-2014. The system automates submission of new project proposals, annual and monthly budget preparation, advanced performance tracking, analysis, and reporting features. It uses both English and Arabic, and provides public access to data on key accountability metrics. IDMS was developed in partnership with UNDP, USAID-Tatweer, the EU and UNOPS.

Tsunami recovery systems 
Following the devastating 2004 Asian tsunami with the support of UNDP, Development Assistance Database was established in tsunami affected countries - Sri Lanka, Maldives and Thailand and Indonesia, to track financial and technical assistance, as well as results related to tsunami recovery work.

DAD Sri Lanka – The Integrated National Development Information System (INDIS) was first introduced in Sri Lanka in 2005 following the devastating 2004 Asian tsunami to help the Government of Sri Lanka to track disaster needs, plan recovery programs and promote visibility and accountability in project spending and performance. INDIS allowed reconstruction agencies to report their projects and share information on objectives, funding sources, implementation partners and project progress online, with the ultimate goal of facilitating efficient aid coordination.

DAD Indonesia - Synergy built the Recovery Aceh Nias (RAN) Database for the Government of Indonesia to support its coordination and management of the post-tsunami recovery effort. The RAN assisted the Government to align proposed projects with national reconstruction priorities, ensuring a coordinated plan for the delivery of aid. The RAN Database was the central tool for coordinating tsunami recovery activities and to date has tracked $3.7 billion in disbursements. Synergy was awarded the Innovative Government Technology Award in the Information Management category at the 2008 FutureGov Summit for the development of the Recovery Aceh Nias (RAN) Database installed for the BRR – Reconstruction and Rehabilitation Agency of the Government of Indonesia.

DAD Maldives - Synergy was contracted by the government of Maldives to implemented the Development Assistance Database (DAD) that was later linked with the National Recovery Reconstruction Plan (NRRP). This helped to implement a key tenet of the Paris Declaration by “aligning” projects with national priorities as outlined in the NRRP and add the accountability mechanism.

DAD Thailand - Synergy customized the DAD for the Thailand International Cooperation Agency located within the Ministry of Foreign Affairs. Launched in 2005, DAD Thailand, has significantly improved coordination and monitoring of the long-term international support to tsunami recovery in Thailand.

DAD Community of Practice 
The Development Assistance Database (DAD) Community of Practice (CoP) is a global forum of practitioners who share a common commitment to advancing development effectiveness through the application of DAD.

 The major event of the DAD CoP is a biennial conference that brings together participants representing governments, aid agencies, civil society organizations, think-tanks, and the private sector. The conference centers on a workshop that features case studies in implementing DAD to improve management of development data.

The DAD CoP currently has over 80 members from about 20 countries, including Afghanistan, Armenia, Cameroon, Central African Republic, Comoros, India, Iraq, Kenya, Lesotho, Mauritania, Moldova, Mozambique, Namibia, Pakistan, Sierra Leone, Solomon Islands, Somalia, Sri Lanka, Tajikistan, and Yemen. The International Aid Transparency Initiative (IATI) also participates in the DAD CoP.

Three DAD CoP forums have been organized so far - DAD CoP 2014, Nairobi, Kenya, DAD CoP 2011, Yerevan, Armenia and DAD CoP 2009 Yerevan, Armenia.

See also 
Synergy International Systems

External links
Synergy International Systems, Inc.

References

United Nations documents
Business software